The LH platform served as the basis for the Chrysler Concorde, Chrysler LHS, Chrysler 300M, Dodge Intrepid, Eagle Vision, and the final Chrysler New Yorker. A Plymouth to be called the "Accolade" was planned, but never saw production. The platform pioneered Chrysler's "cab-forward" design; featured on some Chrysler, Dodge, and Eagle cars in the 1990s and early 2000s.

Development 
As the 1990s dawned, Chrysler faced a renewed round of financial troubles. The US economy slipped into a recession following the 1987 Black Monday stock market crash and the Savings and Loan Crisis, but the company's main problems were due to a lack of engineering innovation and careless spending during the years of prosperity in the 1980s. Most of Chrysler's lineup was based on the proven, but dated K-car platform, plus debt accumulated from expensive purchases including Italian automaker Lamborghini along with American Motors, and critics routinely criticized their inability to produce cars that were competitive with Japanese companies or Ford, which had just struck a coup-de-grace with the Taurus line. It was time for Chrysler to make a fresh start for the 1990s. The Board of Directors at Chrysler announced that Lee Iacocca would retire at the end of 1992. Iacocca was promoting Gerald Greenwald as his replacement, but that bought opposition. Although some suspected that he would later turn the leadership over to Bob Lutz, the board instead designated an outsider, the straitlaced Bob Eaton as the new chairman. With Chrysler facing an uncertain future in the late 1980s, engineering teams were now allowed to explore new designs that had been largely discouraged under Iacocca's tenure.

The LH platform was based on the American Motors-developed and Renault-derived Eagle Premier. According to Bob Lutz, "[t]he Premier had an excellent chassis and drove so damned well that it served as a benchmark for the LH ... the spiritual father, the genetic antecedent of the LH is the Premier." Like the Premier, the LH-cars featured a longitudinally-mounted engine with a front-wheel drive drivetrain, unusual in most U.S. front-wheel drive cars, but a hallmark of Renault's designs. This arrangement meant that the design team had to use a chain to connect the automatic transmission with the front differential, a design reminiscent of the original Oldsmobile Toronado though subject to greater wear and noise.

The LH platform team was headed by François Castaing, who was previously responsible for product engineering and development at American Motors Corporation (AMC). Working with an engineering team of only 700, it took just over three years from the styling studio to the showrooms. To give focus for the platform engineering team, the benchmark target was the Eagle Premier.

Exterior styling was heavily influenced by another Chrysler design which debuted as the Lamborghini Portofino, a concept car introduced at the 1987 Frankfurt Auto Show.

The Dodge and Eagle LH cars competed directly against the Ford Taurus and other mid-size cars, largely replacing the K-based C-bodies. The Chrysler models competed with upmarket domestics such as Buick and Oldsmobile. The LH cars debuted in 1992 and were updated in 1997. The LH platform was replaced with the rear-wheel drive Chrysler LX platform for the 2005 model year. While Chrysler's sales never rose to the levels of those popular rivals, the LH vehicles succeeded in altering Chrysler's previously dowdy public image, recasting the automaker as an innovative design leader. The cab-forward look also influenced Chrysler's subsequent compact PL (Chrysler Neon) and midsize JA platform car designs in the 1990s. 

Much as the company had done in the months leading up to the introduction of the K-platform cars in 1980, Chrysler referred directly to the LH platform in advertisements touting the advantages of its "cab-forward" architecture (generally meant to imply wheels moved out towards the corners of the body; a short, sloping hood; and a large windshield extending from its base over the front wheels), and also referred to the platform name for the Chrysler LHS sedan. Although the real "gold mine" of Chrysler's acquisition of AMC was the Jeep brand, their minivans and LH sedans also helped to bail the company out of almost certain bankruptcy in the 1990s.

First generation (1993–1997)

The first generation LH cars used the existing 3.3 L OHV V6 as well as a new 3.5 L SOHC V6, with a four-speed automatic transmission as standard.

Cars built on the first version of the LH platform:
 1993-1997 Chrysler Concorde
 1993-1997 Dodge Intrepid
 1993-1997 Eagle Vision
 1994-1996 Chrysler New Yorker
 1994-1997 Chrysler LHS

All versions shared a  wheelbase. One year after the original three cars were introduced, the "stretched" LHS and New Yorker had different rear bodywork providing  more overall length as well as a revised rear seat providing more legroom. 

Originally, Chrysler came close to giving Plymouth a variant of the LH platform, called the Plymouth Accolade, a name consistent with the then-current Plymouth Acclaim. It was to be a base model below the equipment level of the Intrepid. The Accolade never made it into production.

Second generation (1998–2004)

The second generation LH cars used the 2.7 L DOHC V6 and 3.2 L SOHC V6, as well as an updated version of the older 3.5 L, with a four-speed automatic transmission as standard.

Cars built on the second version of the LH platform:
 1998-2004 Chrysler Concorde
 1998-2004 Dodge Intrepid
 1999-2001 Chrysler LHS
 1999-2004 Chrysler 300M
 2002-2004 Chrysler Concorde Limited

When Chrysler discontinued the Eagle brand after 1998, the Chrysler 300M was introduced as a replacement for the Vision. The 300M was several inches shorter than Concorde, Intrepid, & LHS, due to shorter front and rear overhangs in order to bring the car's length under 5 meters.

Media
One episode of Robert Reich's 1992 PBS miniseries Made In America focused on the then-yet-to-be-released LH's development and its role in reversing Chrysler's flagging fortunes. A camouflaged Dodge Intrepid is seen being put through the paces at Chrysler's test track, along with concept sketches and other behind-the-scenes activities.

See also

 Chrysler platforms
 Dodge Monaco
 Eagle Premier
 Lamborghini Portofino

References

External links
 
 

LH
American Motors